The 1987 Miami Hurricanes football team represented the University of Miami during the 1987 NCAA Division I-A football season. It was the Hurricanes' 62nd season of football. The Hurricanes were led by fourth-year head coach Jimmy Johnson and played their home games at the Orange Bowl. They finished the season 12–0 overall. They were invited to the Orange Bowl where they defeated Oklahoma, 20-14, to win the school's second national championship.

Pre-season
After taking over as head coach in 1984, Jimmy Johnson had a winning record, but some critics questioned whether he could gain a national championship.

In 1985, Miami finished the regular season 10-1, and had a chance to win the national title with Penn State's loss to Oklahoma in the Orange Bowl. Needing a victory over Tennessee in the Sugar Bowl, Miami jumped out to a 7-0 lead. Tennessee then scored 35 unanswered to derail Miami's title hopes.

In 1986, Miami achieved a perfect 11-0 regular season record.  Led by Heisman Trophy-winner Vinny Testaverde, a record breaking offense, and the 5th-ranked defense in the country, #1 Miami was a prohibitive favorite heading into its Fiesta Bowl matchup against #2 Penn State.  However, Penn State was able to disrupt the Miami passing game and force the Hurricanes into seven turnovers.  Penn State won the national championship with a 14-10 victory over Miami that was sealed when a Testaverde pass from the Penn State 6-yard line was intercepted in the endzone by linebacker Pete Giftopoulos with 0:18 left in the game.

Despite losing three key players (Testaverde, Alonzo Highsmith, and Jerome Brown) from the '86 squad who were selected within the first nine picks of the 1987 NFL Draft, 1987 was expected to be somewhat of a reloading year for Miami, which began the season ranked 10th in the nation by the AP poll.

By year's end, the Hurricanes had allowed a mere 125 points. Miami took down six ranked opponents that fall – including No. 20 Florida, No. 4 FSU, No. 10 Notre Dame and No. 1 Oklahoma. The Canes earned victories by an average of 23.9 points, scoring over 40 points on five different games.

Schedule

Personnel

Roster

Coaching staff

Support staff

Rankings

Game summaries

No. 20 Florida

Under the direction of sophomore quarterback Steve Walsh and a defense that returned nine starters, Miami opened the regular season with a win over rival Florida, 31–4.  The game would prove to be the last in a series that had been played annually since 1944.  The teams would not meet in the regular season again until the 2002 season.

at No. 10 Arkansas

    
    
    
    
    
    
    
    
    
    

The victory over Florida was followed by a 51–7 victory over #10 Arkansas Razorbacks in Little Rock, which would catapult Miami to a #3 ranking.

at No. 4 Florida State

    
    
    
    
    
    
    
    
    

Miami's rigorous early season schedule continued the next week with a showdown with #4 Florida State at Doak Campbell Stadium in Tallahassee.  The October 3 game featured not only high drama, but also an astounding 56 players who would go on to play in the NFL.  Miami scored first with a second-quarter field goal, but Florida State, fielding a team many consider to be the best in school history, took control of the game after that.  A 67-yard run by Florida State running back Sammie Smith was followed by a 1-yard touchdown run from Dayne Williams, giving FSU a 7-3 lead.  A 36-yard field goal from Derek Schmidt pushed the Seminoles' lead to 10-3 at the half.

After Schmidt missed a third-quarter field goal wide right, Miami took over, but went three-and-out and was forced to punt.  The ensuing punt by Jeff Feagles was blocked and returned by Florida State for a touchdown, increasing the Florida State lead to 16-3 (Schmidt missed the extra point).  Miami was forced to punt again, and a big return by FSU's Deion Sanders put Florida State in position to add another Schmidt field goal to make the score 19-3.

With Miami having been unable to mount any offense to that point, the Hurricanes looked to be in dire straits late in the third quarter.  Spurred on by an impassioned speech from receiver Michael Irvin, the Hurricanes were able to keep their focus and climbed back into the game when Walsh found a streaking Melvin Bratton for a 49-yard touchdown.  Miami went for two, which they converted when Walsh was able to hook up with receiver Brian Blades, trimming the FSU lead to 19-11 heading into the fourth quarter.

The final quarter was filled with back-and-forth drama.  Irvin started things off when he was on the receiving end of a 26-yard touchdown pass from Walsh.  With the score now at 19-17, Miami again went for two, which Miami, again, converted, this time on a pass from Walsh to Warren Williams.  With the game now tied at 19-19 and its 16-point lead evaporated, Florida State staged a drive of its own, taking the ball down to the Miami 17-yard line before quarterback Danny McManus fumbled the snap, which was recovered by Bennie Blades.  Miami wasted little time in capitalizing on the miscue, as four plays later Walsh hooked up with Irvin for one of the most famous plays in University of Miami history.  Walsh walked to the line, read the FSU defense, and called an audible for Irvin, who was appropriately nicknamed "The Playmaker" due to his penchant for making big plays.  Walsh took a quick three-step drop and hung the ball up perfectly for Irvin on a fly route.  Irvin was in double coverage, but was able to get behind the coverage, catch the pass, and take it 73-yards for a Miami touchdown.  With 2:22 left to play, Miami led 26-19.

Florida State would not go meekly, though, as the Seminoles valiantly fought back after taking possession on their own 25-yard line.  Before long, the Seminoles were in the endzone when McManus hit Ronald Lewis on a perfect corner route for 18-yards.  With college football not having overtime at the time, Florida State head coach Bobby Bowden was faced with a decision: attempt the extra point and settle for a 26-26 tie, or attempt a two-point conversion and go for the win.  Complicating matters was the fact that Schmidt, FSU's kicker, had looked shaky on this day, already missing on a field goal attempt and on an extra point attempt.  Nevertheless, Bowden initially had decided to kick the extra point and settle for the tie, as he had stated when asked before the game what he would if he found himself in this exact predicament.  But after the FSU offense protested and urged their coach to go for the win, Bowden changed his mind and decided to go for the two, betting both FSU's and Miami's national championship hopes on the outcome.  FSU called a pass play.  McManus took the snap, looked for a receiver, and then threw into the right corner of the endzone.  The ball was underthrown and broken up by Miami defensive back Bubba McDowell before it could reach its intended target.  With Miami up 26-25, Florida State attempted an onside kick on the ensuing kickoff, but Miami recovered the ball with 0:42 left and was able to run out the clock, sealing the Hurricane victory.

Maryland

Having successfully negotiated its brutal early season schedule, Miami won its next four games with ease, beating Maryland (46–16), Cincinnati (48–10), East Carolina (41–3), and Miami (Ohio) (54–3).

at Cincinnati

at East Carolina

Miami (OH)

Virginia Tech

The Hurricanes, a 38-point favorite, broke a 13-13 tie with 4:51 remaining on a 1-yard TD run by Melvin Bratton. Miami put the game out of reach by scoring the final touchdown with 34 seconds left to win 27-13. This was Frank Beamer's first year as head coach at Virginia Tech.

Toledo

No. 10 Notre Dame

    
    
    
    

Next up for the now 2nd-ranked Hurricanes was a date with #10 Notre Dame in Miami.  Notre Dame coach Lou Holtz brought an upset minded Irish squad to the Orange Bowl, but they proved to be little match for Daniel Stubbs and a relentless Hurricane defense.  Miami continued its dominance over Notre Dame, shutting out the Irish, 24–0, and beating them for the fourth straight time.  It was also the first time Notre Dame had been shutout since 1983, when they were also shutout at the hands of the Hurricanes.

No. 8 South Carolina

    
    
    
    
    
    
    

Miami's final regular season game came at home against #8 South Carolina.  South Carolina played a spirited game and gave the Hurricanes all they could handle.  Eventually, Miami was able to walk away from the nail biter with a hard-fought 20–16 victory, capping an 11–0 regular season.

vs. No. 1 Oklahoma (Orange Bowl)

Source: Box Score
    
    
    
    
    
    

The 1988 Orange Bowl featured "Game of the Century"-type billing as the undefeated and top-ranked Oklahoma Sooners faced off against undefeated and second-ranked Miami for the national championship.  Adding to the hype was the recent on-field history between the teams.  Oklahoma was a dominant force in college football, winning the national championship in 1985 and losing just one game in each of the preceding two years.  Miami, though, had proven to be the thorn in Oklahoma's side, as the Sooners' losses in '85 and '86 had both come at the hands of Miami.  Now, with the national championship on the line, Miami sought to make it three-losses-in-three-years for Oklahoma, and also their first postseason bowl win under Jimmy Johnson after three straight bowl losses, two in which they struggled and lost their chances to win the national championships.  Further fuel for the fire was provided by the growing personal animosity between former Arkansas player Johnson and Oklahoma head coach Barry Switzer, who was also a former Arkansas player.

Miami's vaunted defense set the tone early, forcing the Sooners to punt on their first five possessions.  Meanwhile, Walsh settled into a nice rhythm, putting Miami on the board first with a 30-yard touchdown pass to fullback Melvin Bratton, who caught 9 passes for 102 yards for the game.  Oklahoma got on the board with a second-quarter touchdown to tie things up, but Miami responded with 10 unanswered third quarter points, coming on an Orange Bowl record 56-yard field goal by kicker Greg Cox and a 23-yard touchdown pass from Walsh to Irvin.  Oklahoma would add a fourth-quarter touchdown to trim the score to 20–14, but Miami held on for the win and the national championship.  Johnson received a Gatorade bath, which messed his trademark impeccably coiffed hair, and was carried off the field, having finally won "the big one" at Miami.

The Hurricane defense held Oklahoma to just 255 yards of offense, while Walsh's efficient play (18 of 30, 209 yards, 2 touchdowns) paced the Hurricane offense.  Middle linebacker Bernard "Tiger" Clark- a backup middle linebacker who was forced to start after starting MLB George Mira Jr. was suspended for failing a drug test- was named the MVP of the Orange Bowl after recording 14 tackles (12 unassisted).

With the win, Miami completed its first ever undefeated season.  In winning their second national championship, the Canes once again had to go through the nation's top-ranked team at the Orange Bowl, just as they had done in 1983.

Awards and honors

Consensus All-Americans
Bennie Blades, FS
Daniel Stubbs, LE

Awards finalists
Bold indicates winners
Bennie Blades, FS – Jim Thorpe Award
Daniel Stubbs, LE – Outland Trophy

Jack Harding University of Miami MVP Award
Steve Walsh, QB

1988 NFL Draft

A total of 12 Hurricanes were drafted by 10 different franchises in 1988, including three wide receivers in the first 52 picks.

References

Miami
Miami Hurricanes football seasons
College football national champions
Orange Bowl champion seasons
College football undefeated seasons
Miami Hurricanes football